Goofy's Hysterical History Tour is a video game released on September 28, 1993, for the Sega Genesis by Absolute Entertainment.

Plot
Goofy finally finds a job that he likes at the Ludwig von Drake History Museum and he turns into a great janitor worker, but his enemy Pete is out to get him fired by sabotaging the exhibits. Goofy must recover the missing pieces of the exhibits, defeat Pete, and save his job all before the curator comes in tomorrow. With Goofy's Extend-O-Hand, the player must travel through time in order to complete his mission. These missions include Medieval Times, the Age of Piracy, Prehistoric Times, and the Wild West.

Reception

See also
List of Disney video games by genre

References

External links
Goofy's Hysterical History Tour on Mobygames

1993 video games
Absolute Entertainment games
Goofy (Disney) video games
North America-exclusive video games
Platform games
Sega Genesis games
Sega Genesis-only games
Side-scrolling video games
Video games about dogs
Video games scored by Mark Van Hecke
Video games developed in the United States
Single-player video games